Jens Bullerjahn (15 July 1962 – 26 November 2022) was a German engineer and politician. A member of the Social Democratic Party, he served in the Landtag of Saxony-Anhalt from 1990 to 2016. From 2006 to 2016, he served concurrently as Vice-Minister-President and Minister of Finances of Saxony-Anhalt. He was able to reduce the state's indebtedness.

Life and career 
Born in Halle, Bullerjahn first trained to be an electrician from 1979 to 1981. From 1984, he studied electrical engineering at the Fachschule Magdeburg, graduating in 1987. He then worked as an engineer for process optimisation for the  until 1990.

Political career 
Bullerjahn began his political career for the Social Democratic Party (SPD) at the communal level. He was a member of the SDP/SPD from 1989. Bullerjahn was elected a member of the Landtag of Saxony-Anhalt in 1990 and served until 2016. He was CEO of his party in the state parliament from 1993 to 2004. From 1994 to 2002, he stood for the "", in which a SPD government without majority was tolerated by the left parties; it continued the state’s increase of indebtedness of the previous CDU government. In the 2002 election, the SPD performed poorly. Bullerjahn began to question his approach, and sought conversations with economic researchers (Wirtschaftsforscher). Over the next 1 years, he wrote a paper consisting of strategies for sustainable consolidation of finances by financial politics through 2020: Zukunftsorientierte Finanzpolitik bis 2020. Strategien für eine nachhaltige Konsolidierung, published in 2008.

Bullerjahn led the SPD in the 2006 election, but they reached only the third position. In the resulting coalition, he served as both Vice-Minister-President and Minister of Finances of Saxony-Anhalt. He led the SPD again in the 2011 election, and held both offices until 2016. As Minister of Finances, he pursued a strict savings policy (Sparpolitik), to not only avoid more debt, but to reduce the existing, which he managed over the last three years in office. He was criticised, also within his party, for reducing the number tax offices and prisons, and for providing less support of cultural and scientific institutions, among others.

After retiring from his political posts, he worked as a consultant and book author.

Personal life 
Bullerjahn was married; the couple had two sons.

In 2021, Bullerjahn was diagnosed with amytrophic lateral sclerosis, which he made public a year later. He died in a hospital in Eisleben on 26 November 2022, at age 60.

Awards 
 2021 Order of Merit of Saxony-Anhalt

Works

Papers

Books

Thesis

References

External links

1962 births
2022 deaths
Members of the Landtag of Saxony-Anhalt
Social Democratic Party of Germany politicians
Deaths from motor neuron disease 
Neurological disease deaths in Germany
20th-century German politicians
People from Halle (Saale)